KVCK-FM (92.7 FM) is a radio station licensed to serve Wolf Point, Montana.  The station is owned by Wolftrax Broadcasting, LLC. It airs a country music format.

This station was named to complement its older AM sister station KVCK. That station was named for its three original owners: 'V' for Mike Vukelich, 'C' for Pete Coffey, and 'K' for Ed Krebsbach. The station was assigned the KVCK-FM call letters by the Federal Communications Commission on November 15, 1992.

Translators

References

External links
Wolf Point Memories (includes several historical KVCK photos)

VCK-FM
Country radio stations in the United States
Roosevelt County, Montana